This list ranks metropolitan areas in Europe by their population according to three different sources; it includes metropolitan areas that have a population of over 1 million.

Sources
List includes metropolitan areas according only studies of ESPON, Eurostat, and OECD. For this reason some metropolitan areas, like Italian Genoa Metropolitan Area (population is over 1.510.000 as of 2012 according "CityRailway" Official Report), aren't included in this list, with data by other statistic survey institutes.

Figures in the first column come from the ESPON project, "Study on Urban Functions", which defines cities according to the concept of a functional urban area (core urban area defined morphologically on the basis of population density, plus the surrounding labour pool defined on the basis of commuting). Figures in the second column come from Eurostat's Urban Audit and correspond to Larger Urban Zones (LUZ). Figures in the fourth column come from the OECD Territorial Reviews and correspond to "metropolitan regions". Further information on how the areas are defined can be found in the source documents. These figures should be seen as an interpretation, not as conclusive fact.

Metropolitan areas

Polycentric metropolitan areas in the European Union

See also
List of cities in Europe by population within city limits
List of urban areas in Europe
List of European city regions
Lists of cities in Europe
List of largest cities in the European Union by population within city limits
List of urban areas in the European Union
List of European Union cities proper by population density
List of metropolitan areas by population for the world
World's largest cities

Regional and country-specific lists
Largest metropolitan areas in the Nordic countries
List of metropolitan areas in the United Kingdom
List of metropolitan areas in Belgium
List of metropolitan areas in France
List of metropolitan areas in Germany
List of metropolitan areas in Italy
List of metropolitan areas in Spain
List of metropolitan areas in Sweden
List of metropolitan areas in Poland

Notes

References

External links
 Geopolis: research group, university of Paris-Diderot, France -  Population of urban areas of 10,000 or more

Metropolitan areas by population
Metropolitan areas
 
Europe, metropolitan areas